Date and time notation in Canada combines conventions from the United Kingdom, conventions from the United States, and conventions from France, often creating confusion. The Government of Canada specifies the ISO 8601 format for all-numeric dates (--; for example). It recommends writing the time using the 24-hour clock for maximum clarity in both Canadian English and Canadian French, but also allows the 12-hour clock in English.

Date 

When writing the full date, English speakers vacillate between the forms inherited from the United Kingdom (day first, 7 January) and United States (month first, January 7), depending on the region and context. French speakers consistently write the date with the day first. The government endorses all these forms when using words, but recommends only the ISO format for all-numeric dates to avoid error.

English 
The date can be written either with the day or the month first in Canadian English, optionally with the day of the week. For example, the seventh day of January 2016 can be written as:

 Thursday, 7 January 2016 or Thursday, January 7, 2016
 7 January 2016 or January 7, 2016
 2016-01-07

The month-day-year sequence is the most common method of writing the full date in English, but formal letters, academic papers, and reports often prefer the day-month-year sequence. Even in the United States, where the month-day-year sequence is even more prevalent, the Chicago Manual of Style recommends the day-month-year format for material that requires many full dates, since it does not require commas and has wider international recognition. Writing the date in this form is also useful for bilingual comprehension, as it matches the French sequence of writing the date. Documents with an international audience, including the Canadian passport, use the day-month-year format.

The date is sometimes written out in words, especially in formal documents such as contracts and invitations, following spoken forms:

 "… on this the seventh day of January, two thousand and sixteen …"
 "… Thursday, the seventh of January, two thousand and sixteen …"
 informal: "… Thursday, January [the] seventh, twenty sixteen …"

French 
French usage consistently places the day first when writing the full date. The standard all-numeric date format is common between English and French:

 
 
 2016-01-07

The first day of the month is written with an ordinal indicator: .

The article  is required in prose except when including the day of the week in a date. When writing a date for administrative purposes (such as to date a document), one can write the date with or without the article.

All-numeric dates 
The Government of Canada recommends that all-numeric dates in both English and French use the -- format codified in ISO 8601. The Standards Council of Canada also specifies this as the country's date format.

The -- format is the only method of writing a numeric date in Canada that allows unambiguous interpretation, and the only officially recommended format. The presence of the // (most of the world) and // (American) formats often results in misinterpretation. Using these systems, the date 7 January 2016 could be written as either 07/01/16 or 01/07/16, which readers can also interpret as 1 July 2016 (or 1 July 1916); conversely, 2016-01-07 cannot be interpreted as another date.

In spite of its official status and broad usage, there is no binding legislation requiring the use of the -- format, and other date formats continue to appear in many contexts. For example, Payments Canada prefers ISO 8601, but allows cheques to be printed using any date format. Even some government forms, such as commercial cargo manifests, offer a blank line with no guidance. To remedy this, Daryl Kramp tabled a private member's bill directing courts on the interpretation of numeric dates by amending the Canada Evidence Act in 2011, which would effectively outlaw all numeric date formats other than --. Todd Doherty revived this bill in 2015, but it did not progress beyond first reading before the end of the 42nd Canadian Parliament.

Federal regulations for shelf life dates on perishable goods mandate a year/month/day format, but allow the month to be written in full, in both official languages, or with a set of standardized two-letter bilingual codes, such as 2016  07 or 16  07. The year is required only if the date is beyond the current year, and can be written with two or four digits. These codes are occasionally found in other contexts, alongside other abbreviations specific to English or French.

Time 

Canada was an early adopter of the 24-hour clock, which Sandford Fleming promoted as key to accurate communication alongside time zones and a standard prime meridian. The Canadian Pacific Railway (CPR) began to use it in 1886, prior to its official adoption by European countries. The 24-hour notation is shorter, removes the potential for confusing the first and second halves of the day especially visible at midnight (00:00 or 24:00, 12:00a.m.) and noon (12:00, 12:00p.m.), and is language-neutral. English speakers use both the 24- and 12-hour clocks, while French speakers use the 24-hour clock universally.

English 
The Government of Canada recommends using the 24-hour clock to avoid ambiguity, and many industries require it. Fifteen minutes after eight o'clock at night can be written:

 20:15
 20:15:00
 8:15 p.m.

The 24-hour clock is widely used in contexts such as transportation, medicine, environmental services, and data transmission, "preferable for greater precision and maximum comprehension the world over". Its use is mandatory in parts of the government as an element of the Federal Identity Program, especially in contexts such as signage where speakers of both English and French read the same text.

The government describes the 24-hour system as "desirable" but does not enforce its use, meaning that the 12-hour clock remains common for oral and informal usage in English-speaking contexts. This situation is similar to the use of the 24-hour clock in the United Kingdom.

French 
Communications in Canadian French write the time using 24-hour notation for all purposes. The hours and minutes can be written with different separators depending on the context:

 
 20:15 (tables, schedules, and other technical or bilingual uses)

References 

Time in Canada
Canada